The 1984–85 Syracuse Orangemen basketball team represented Syracuse University during the 1984–85 men's college basketball season. The Head coach was Jim Boeheim, serving for his 9th season. The team played home games at the Carrier Dome in Syracuse, New York.  The team finished with a 22–9 (9–7) record while making it to the second round of the NCAA tournament.

Roster

Schedule

|-
!colspan=12 style=| Non-Conference Regular Season

|-
!colspan=12 style=| Big East Regular Season

|-
!colspan=12 style=| Big East Tournament

|-
!colspan=12 style=| NCAA Tournament

References

Syracuse Orange men's basketball seasons
Syracuse Orangemen
Syracuse Orangemen
Syracuse Orange
Syracuse Orange